The 2017 Collegiate Basketball Awards was an awarding ceremony organized by the UAAP-NCAA Press Corps, a group of sports journalists who are covering the men's basketball tournaments of the University Athletics Association of the Philippines (UAAP) and the National Collegiate Athletic Association (NCAA). UAAP Press Corps is currently headed by Reuben Terrado of Sports Interactive Network Philippines, while the NCAA Press Corps is headed by Cedelf P. Tupas of the Philippine Daily Inquirer.

The awarding will be held at the Montgomery Place Social Hall, E. Rodriguez Avenue, Quezon City on January 26, 2017. The awards ceremony was hosted by Ganiel Krishnan.

Awardees

See also
2016 in Philippine sports

References

2016 in Philippine sport
2017 sports awards